Atlin Mountain, at , is a medium-sized mountain located next to Atlin Lake in the northern end of the Coast Mountain range in British Columbia, Canada. It is home to the Atlin Mountain Challenge and Snow Drags snowmobile event and the Atlin Mountain Hill Climb.

References
Footnotes

Sources

External links
 Atlinfrom Travel British Columbia

Two-thousanders of British Columbia
Atlin District